The Vanguard Formation is a stratigraphical unit of Callovian to Oxfordian age in the Western Canadian Sedimentary Basin.

It takes the name from Vanguard, and was first defined by R.L. Milner and G.E. Thomas in 1954.

Lithology
The Vanguard Formation is composed of calcareous shale with a median quartzose sandstone.

Distribution

Relationship to other units

The Vanguard Formation is unconformably overlain by the Mannville Group and disconformably overlays the Shaunavon Formation.

It is equivalent to the Ellis Group in Montana and North Dakota.

Subdivisions
In south-western Saskatchewan, Vanguard has group status, and includes the following subdivisions (of formation rank):
Masefield Shale: calcareous shale
Roseray Formation: quartzose glauconitic sandstone
Rush Lake Shale: calcareous shale with Gryphaea and Kepplerites ammonite fossils

References

Geologic formations of Saskatchewan
Shale formations
Jurassic Saskatchewan
Oil-bearing shales in Canada
Western Canadian Sedimentary Basin